Jung Jae-kwang (born November 29, 1990) is a South Korean actor. He is best known for his roles in dramas It's Okay to Not Be Okay, The Fiery Priest, Witch at Court and Nevertheless. He also appeared in movies Extreme Job, Pipeline and The Witness.

Filmography

Film

Television series

Awards and nominations

References

External links
 
 

1990 births
Living people
21st-century South Korean male actors
South Korean male film actors
South Korean male models
South Korean male television actors
Chung-Ang University alumni